The Louth Intermediate Football Championship is an annual Gaelic Athletic Association competition, organised by Louth GAA, among the intermediate grade Gaelic football clubs in County Louth, Ireland.

History
The competition, introduced as a bridge between the senior and junior grades, was first staged in 1907 and annually until 1912, when the county board discontinued it. It was revived 32 years later in 1944. However, the competition was only staged twice before it lapsed again. It re-emerged permanently on the county scene in 1978 with Kilkerley Emmets becoming the first winners of the Seamus Flood Cup.

Honours
The winning team is presented with the Seamus Flood Cup, named after the Dundalk GAA official (d. April 1970) and Clan Na Gael club member who was chairman of Leinster GAA from 1939 to 1941. The Leinster Under-20 Football Championship trophy is also named in his honour.

The winners of the Louth Intermediate Football Championship progress to the Leinster Intermediate Club Football Championship.

Finals

 Title awarded to John Boyle O'Reilly's. Castlebellingham had fielded unregistered players

See also
 Leinster Intermediate Club Football Championship

References

External links
 Louth GAA official website
 Louth on Hoganstand

Louth GAA club championships
Intermediate Gaelic football county championships